Maidan Wardak, also called Wardag or Wardak, is one of the 34 provinces of Afghanistan, located in the central region of Afghanistan. It is divided into eight districts and has a population of approximately 500,000. The capital of the province is Maidan Shar, while the most populous district in the province is Saydabad District. Wardak is known for one of its famous high peak mountain known as (Shah Foladi).

In 2021, the Taliban gained control of the province during the 2021 Taliban offensive.

History

During the communist times, the people of Wardak never gave significant support to the communist government. Wardak Province was significant during the Civil War in Afghanistan, due to its proximity with Kabul and its agricultural lands. Hezb-e Wahdat had a significant presence in the area. Most of the area was captured by the Taliban around winter 1995. It remains a major Taliban travel route to Kabul with Maidan Shar a target for terror.

The security situation rapidly deteriorated in Wardak in 2008 and 2009. According to a report by Mohammad Osman Tariq Elias, both Logar and Wardak, by the end of 2008, were under de facto Taliban control. As of April 2009, the Ministry of the Interior (Afghanistan) had listed the entire province as "High Risk."

In October 2017, US Forces from elements of the 1st Battalion 87th Infantry Regiment and 10th Special Operations Group launched an offensive to wrest the province from Taliban control.

On 21 January 2019, a Taliban attack on a military base and police training center in the province resulted in 125 NDS officers killed. At least 30 people were reported to be injured. The attack came during a time of intense daily violence throughout the country.

Geography

Wardak province is located in the central and eastern region of Afghanistan; bordering Parwan to the northeast, Kabul and Logar to the east, Ghazni to the south and Bamyan to the west. The capital of Wardak province is Maidan Shar, which is located about 35 km from Kabul. Wardak province covers an area of 9,934 km2. It is mountainous like the rest of the country with plains and many valleys, such as the Tangi Valley. The majority of its residents live in rural areas. The most heavily populated areas are along the Kabul–Kandahar Highway. The rest of the province is thinly populated, with villages concentrated in areas with available irrigation and water sources (CSO and UNFPA, 2003). Famous passes include the Unai Pass and the Hajigak Pass.

Economics and industry

In terms of industry, one marble factory is working in the province, and there are marble mines in the provincial center and Sayed Abad District although no mining is currently undertaken there due to the government ban. The majority of commercial activity in Maidan Shahr. Wardak is related to trade in agricultural and livestock products, although stone quarrying is also a growing business in the area. The people from Maidan Shahr are also experts in karez cleaning and repair and go to other parts of the country for this purpose. In Wardak, there are many natural resources like petroleum, iron, rubies, and emeralds.

Agriculture is a major source of revenue for 43% of households in Wardak province. Four-fifths (79%) of rural households own or manage agricultural land or garden plots in the province.  However, nearly a quarter (24%) of households in the province derive income from trade and services, and around half (45%) of households earn some income through non-farm related labor.

Education

The overall literacy rate in Wardak province is 25%. There are around 251 primary and secondary schools in the province catering for 105,358 students. There are 2909 teachers teaching in these schools.

Demographics 

As of 2021, the total population of Wardak province is about 671,817. The province is predominantly Sunni Pashtun and Shia Hazaras with Sunni Tajiks making up most of the remainder of the population. The Tajiks live primarily in northern districts of the province while the Hazaras live in the western part of the province. The province also has a small population of Qizilbash.

Districts

See also
 Wardak (Pashtun tribe)
 Provinces of Afghanistan

References

External links

 Wardak Province by the Institute for the Study of War
 Wardak Province by the Naval Postgraduate School

 
Provinces of Afghanistan
Hazarajat
Provinces of the Islamic Republic of Afghanistan